The fifth series of Warsaw Shore, a Polish television programme based in Warsaw, Poland was announced on 13 November 2015. The fifth season began airing on 28 February 2016. This was the first series not to include Alan Kwieciński, who left the show at the end of the previous series and was the first to feature twin brothers – Pauly and Pietro Kluk in his place. This series marks the return of Ewelina Kubiak as a main cast member. Ahead of the series it was confirmed that the series would be filmed in Wrocław. On 18 April 2016 it was announced that original cast member Anna Ryśnik had quit the show and that this would be her last series.

Cast
Anna Ryśnik (Episodes 1–8)
Damian Zduńczyk
Ewelina Kubiak (Episodes 5–16)
Jakub Henke
Klaudia Stec
Magda Pyznar
Anna "Mała" Aleksandrzak
Paweł Kluk
Piotr Kluk
Wojciech Gola

Duration of cast

Notes 

 Key:  = "Cast member" is featured in this episode.
 Key:  = "Cast member" arrives in the house.
 Key:  = "Cast member" leaves the series.
 Key:  = "Cast member" returns to the series.
 Key:  = "Cast member" is not a cast member in this episode.

Episodes

References 

2016 Polish television seasons
Series 5